Kakhaber "Kakha" Kaladze (born 27 February 1978) is a Georgian politician and former footballer who serves as the Mayor of Tbilisi since November 2017. A versatile player, he was capable of playing both as a centre-back and as a left-back, or even as a wide midfielder. He played for the Georgia national team from 1996 to 2011. He was voted Georgian Footballer of the Year in 2001–2003, 2006 and 2011 and was considered one of Georgia's most important players.

Kaladze started his football career in 1993 at Umaglesi Liga club Dinamo Tbilisi and made 82 appearances in a five-year spell. In 1998, he moved to the Ukrainian club Dynamo Kyiv and made 71 appearances until 2001, when he was signed by the Italian Serie A club Milan. He has won one Serie A, three Ukrainian Premier League and five Umaglesi Liga titles. With Milan, he won the Champions League on two occasions, the UEFA Super Cup once and the FIFA Club World Cup once. After captaining his country 50 times in 84 appearances, Kaladze announced his retirement from the Georgian national team on 11 December 2011.

Born in Samtredia, a town in Imereti Province, Kaladze comes from a footballing family as his father played for Lokomotiv Samtredia and was also president of the team for some time. His brother was kidnapped in a high-profile case in 2001 and officially declared dead in 2006, resulting in two men being sentenced to prison for a combined total of 30 years. Outside of football, he owns a company called Kala Capital and an organisation called Kala Foundation, as well as being an ambassador for SOS Children's Villages. He is married to Anouki Areshidze, with whom he has four children.

Kaladze became involved in the politics of Georgia as a member of the opposition Georgian Dream–Democratic Georgia party, founded by Bidzina Ivanishvili in February 2012. He was elected to the Parliament of Georgia on 1 October 2012 and approved as Deputy Prime Minister as well as Minister of Energy in Ivanishvili's cabinet on 25 October 2012. He continued to occupy both of these position under the succeeding cabinet of Giorgi Kvirikashvili until July 2017, when he resigned to run for the Mayor of Tbilisi as a Georgian Dream candidate in the October 2017 election, which he won with 51.13%. In 2021, he was reelected as the Mayor of Tbilisi, gaining 55.61% of the vote in the second round of the election.

Club career

Early career
Kaladze started his career playing as a striker for his local club Lokomotiv Samtredia, where his father was president, until former Georgia international footballer David Kipiani requested Kakha to join Dinamo Tbilisi. At Dinamo, he played in 82 domestic league games and scored one goal. He made his top-flight debut as a 16-year-old with Dinamo during the 1993–94 campaign. Kaladze claims that a good performance against Italy while playing for Georgia in a match that ended 0–0 brought him to the attention of Dynamo Kyiv; he later said, "In that game I was up against Christian Vieri and I marked him well."

A fee equivalent to €280,000 was enough to take him to the Ukrainian Premier League and Dynamo Kyiv in January 1998, where he signed a four-year deal. Here he scored six goals in 71 league games over the two-and-a-half seasons he spent there. The Ukrainian club had been under the ownership of Hryhoriy Surkis and the late Valeriy Lobanovskyi had just been installed as manager; they would go on to win eight consecutive league titles. Kaladze also appeared in both legs of the semi-final of the 1998–99 Champions League against Bayern Munich, which Dynamo Kyiv lost 4–3 on aggregate. En route to the semi-finals, they beat teams like Real Madrid, Barcelona and Arsenal. He won eight league titles in a row during his time at both Dinamo Tbilisi and Dynamo Kyiv.

A.C. Milan

In January 2001, Kaladze became the most expensive Georgian footballer in history when Milan paid €16 million to bring him to Italy. His decision to join one of the European top teams coincided with witnessing his teammate's near career-ending injury due to poor quality of football pitches in Ukraine at the time. Upon his arrival, Kaladze became a regular starter almost immediately, and played mostly as a left-sided defensive midfielder in 4–4–2 or 4–2–1–3 formations, particularly under caretaker coach Cesare Maldini. In the 2002–03 season, however, he returned to his original role of a defender (left-sided full back and center back), and made 46 appearances in all competitions, including 27 Serie A appearances. That year, Milan won the Champions League, where they beat Juventus on penalties in the final (despite Kaladze missing his penalty) and the Coppa Italia, where they beat Roma 6–3 on aggregate in the final. After Kaladze's double success, the Georgian postal service issued a special stamp bearing the player's image. He is the first Georgian player to win a Champions League title.

Kaladze was limited to just six league appearances and 11 total appearances in the 2003–04 season. In the next season, Kaladze played just 19 Serie A matches and five in the Champions League as Milan finished as runners-up in both competitions. He was an unused substitute in that season's Champions League final, where Milan lost on penalties to Liverpool after a 3–3 draw. He was said to be frustrated with his lack of first-team options and a move to Chelsea, in exchange for Hernán Crespo or for £4 million, was widely reported. Kaladze himself said, "I have agreed everything with the Chelsea management. Now it is necessary to wait for them to reach an agreement with Milan and I think I could become a Chelsea player next week." Chelsea opted to sign Asier del Horno instead. On 30 June 2005, Kaladze extended his contract with Milan until 2010 and again on 4 September 2006, this time until 2011. In 2005–06, an injury to Paolo Maldini meant that Kaladze was moved back into the centre of defence, his favoured position. Milan finished third that season, although they would have finished second if there were no 2006 Italian football scandal which resulted in a 30-point deduction.

In the 2006–07 Serie A campaign, Kaladze scored a goal against Sampdoria which turned out to be his only goal of the season. Milan finished in fourth place with an eight-point deduction relating to the previous season's scandal. Kaladze won his second Champions League title on 23 May 2007 after Milan beat Liverpool 2–1 in the final; he came on as a 79th-minute substitute in that match. He later picked up the FIFA Club World Cup in December that year where Milan beat Boca Juniors 4–2 in the final, though Kaladze was one of two players to be sent off in that match. He had established himself as a first-team regular in the 2007–08 season, making 32 appearances, but had only featured sparingly in the 2008–09 season due to a knee ligament injury sustained in a UEFA Cup match against Zürich. Kaladze's performance on 15 February 2009 Milan derby was described as a "horror show" on the Channel 4 website which started a dispute over an alleged smear campaign between Kaladze and the Georgian newspaper Lelo, who used the quote, "Milan really does need a new centre-back after Kakha Kaladze’s horror show in the derby." Milan finished third in the league that season, ten points behind Serie A champions Inter Milan; Kaladze believed this was caused by the many injuries suffered by the Milan squad.

Genoa
On 31 August 2010, Kaladze signed with Genoa; Milan later revealed that it was a free transfer. In the 2010–11 season, he played 26 matches and scored one goal, which came against Parma on 30 January 2011. He was named as second-best defender of the 2010–11 Serie A by La Gazzetta dello Sport, being surpassed only by his former teammate, Milan's Thiago Silva. On 12 May 2012, Kaladze announced his retirement from football.

International career
Kaladze won his first cap against Cyprus in a friendly match on 27 March 1996, coming on as a 72nd-minute substitute for Mikhail Kavelashvili. Later that year, he was sent off for the first time in his international career against Lebanon in a friendly match. With his team won Malta International Football Tournament 1998. He subsequently featured in his country's qualifying campaigns for the 1998, 2002, 2006 and 2010 FIFA World Cups, and the 2000, 2004 and 2008 UEFA European Championships. Georgia, however, have never qualified for the FIFA World Cup or the UEFA European Championship since they split from the Soviet Union. His competitive debut was against Poland on 14 June 1997 in a 1998 World Cup qualifier; Georgia lost the match 4–1. Just two matches later, Kaladze was sent off for the second time playing for Georgia, along with Georgi Kinkladze, against Moldova in another 1998 World Cup qualifier. Georgia finished in fourth place in the group and failed to qualify. In qualifying for Euro 2000, Georgia finished at the bottom of the group (Group 2) in sixth place, with just one win. Kaladze occasionally captained the side during these qualifiers in the absence of Georgi Nemsadze.

The qualifiers for the 2002 World Cup ended with Georgia finishing in third place, ahead of Hungary and Lithuania. Kaladze played in all of the matches and often missed the friendlies in between. Kaladze only played in three matches during the Euro 2004 qualifiers, where Georgia finished in last place in the group. He did, however, feature in a 1–0 victory over neighbouring Russia, a victory considered to be one of Georgia's greatest successes. Kaladze played in all but one of the 2006 World Cup qualifying matches, where Georgia finished sixth in the group, with Kazakhstan being the only team to finish below them. He played fewer matches during the qualification for Euro 2008 and once again Georgia failed to qualify as they finished in sixth place despite starting their campaign with a 6–0 win over the Faroe Islands.

He scored his first ever international goal against Latvia on 6 February 2008 in a friendly which Georgia lost 3–1. On 5 September 2009, Kaladze scored two own goals in a 2010 World Cup qualifying match against Italy within the space of 11 minutes. The match ended 2–0 to Italy. Kaladze was the captain of the national team, until 11 December 2011, when he announced his retirement. The La Gazzetta dello Sport reporter and the president of International Sports Press Association, AIPS [Italian], Gianni Merlo said: "Kakha Kaladze is a man of the history of football in Georgia. In AC Milan he was a pillar of the defense and also a nice and polite man."

International goal
Scores and results list Georgia's goal tally first.

Personal life
On 23 May 2001, Kakha Kaladze's younger brother Levan, a medical student, was kidnapped in Georgia, with a ransom of $600,000 demanded. Georgia's president at the time, Eduard Shevardnadze, promised that "everything is being done to locate him". Despite this assurance, the only time that Levan was ever seen was in a video where he was shown blindfolded and begging for help. Following the kidnapping, Kaladze threatened to take up Ukrainian citizenship, but reverted his decision, stating, "There was a time when I thought about quitting the national side completely, but I couldn't do it out of respect for the Georgian people and the fans who come and give us such support." Roughly four years later, on 6 May 2005, Georgian police officers found eight dead bodies in the Svaneti region and it was speculated that Levan was among the dead. On 21 February 2006, Levan was officially identified among the deceased, after tests from FBI experts. The local media claimed that the ransom was paid by Kaladze's family, although another source says that Kaladze's father attempted to meet the kidnappers, who fled as they believed he was followed by the police. Two men were sentenced to prison for the murder: David Asatiani for 25 years and Merab Amisulashvili for five years. On 14 July 2009, Kaladze's wife Anouki gave birth to their first-born son in Milan. The couple named their son Levan, in memory of Kaladze's brother.

Kaladze has also been active in charitable causes and is a FIFA ambassador for the SOS Children's Villages. Through his Kala Foundation, a charitable organisation established in 2008, Kaladze raised €50,000 to benefit South Ossetian refugees during the Russian invasion of Georgia. Kaladze also plans to release an autobiography with the proceeds going to the Kala Foundation.

Political career

Business ventures
Along with his football career, Kaladze is an investor in Georgia, Italy, Ukraine and Kazakhstan. Kaladze owns Kala Capital, an investment company established in 2008 in Georgia with a focus on energy businesses, and whose chief executive is former Georgian Prime Minister Zurab Noghaideli.

Kaladze's other businesses include the Buddha Bar in Kyiv that opened in 2008. Kaladze is also the owner of a restaurant called Giannino, founded in 1899 by Giannino Bindi, which is based in Milan. The restaurant has had a Michelin star under Davide Oldani and the chef in charge was Roberto Molinari.

Kala Capital owned 45 percent of the Georgia Hydropower Construction Company company SakHidroEnergoMsheni, a joint stock company incorporated in Georgia in 1998. His candidacy as Minister of Energy and Natural Resources in October 2012 was therefore overshadowed by concerns about a serious risk that a conflict of interests might arise. Reports on the same day indicated that Kaladze might refuse the energy portfolio or sell off his shares in Georgia Hydropower Construction Company within 10 days of his appointment.

Political office and conflict of interests
Kaladze became involved in the politics of Georgia as a member of the opposition Georgian Dream–Democratic Georgia party founded by billionaire Bidzina Ivanishvili in February 2012. He was elected to the Parliament of Georgia on 1 October 2012 as majoritarian of Samtredia constituency. He was approved as Deputy Prime Minister as well as Minister of Energy in the cabinet of Bidzina Ivanishvili on 25 October 2012. The appointment was met with skepticism in professional energy circles. More importantly, it stirred an intense debate on a conflict of interest arising from Kaladze's business interests in the Georgia Hydropower Construction Company, in which Kala Capital owned 45 percent. Kala Capital sold the shares to GMC Group in November 2012 but concerns whether his indirect commercial interests had been abandoned remain.

Mayor of Tbilisi

In July 2017, Kaladze resigned as Energy minister in order to run for Tbilisi mayor in the upcoming local elections. On 22 October, he was elected mayor as a candidate of Georgian Dream, winning the elections with 51% of the votes. He was sworn in on 13 November 2017.

His term expires in 2021. Kaladze has decided to run for a second term as mayor of Tbilisi and to win the elections in 2021. Kaladze started the campaign on July 20.

Career statistics

Club

International
Source:

Honours
Dinamo Tbilisi
 Georgian League: 1993–94, 1994–95, 1995–96, 1996–97, 1997–98
 Georgian Cup: 1994, 1995, 1996, 1997

Dynamo Kyiv
 Ukrainian Premier League: 1998–99, 1999–2000, 2000–01
 Ukrainian Cup: 1997–98, 1998–99, 1999–2000

Milan
 Serie A: 2003–04
 Coppa Italia: 2002–03
 Italian Supercup: 2004
 UEFA Champions League: 2002–03, 2006–07
 UEFA Super Cup: 2003, 2007
 FIFA Club World Cup: 2007

Individual
 Georgian Footballer of the Year: 2001, 2002, 2003, 2006, 2011
 A.C. Milan Hall of Fame
 Source: Eurosport at Yahoo

Electoral history

References

External links

Profile at GenoaFC.it

Kala Foundation – Official Website
Football Database profile
 

Footballers from Georgia (country)
Georgia (country) international footballers
1978 births
Living people
Association football defenders
Businesspeople from Georgia (country)
Georgia (country) under-21 international footballers
FC Samtredia players
FC Dinamo Tbilisi players
FC Dynamo Kyiv players
FC Dynamo-2 Kyiv players
A.C. Milan players
Genoa C.F.C. players
Erovnuli Liga players
Ukrainian Premier League players
Ukrainian First League players
Serie A players
Expatriate footballers from Georgia (country)
Expatriate footballers in Ukraine
Expatriate footballers in Italy
Expatriate sportspeople from Georgia (country) in Ukraine
Expatriate sportspeople from Georgia (country) in Italy
UEFA Champions League winning players
21st-century politicians from Georgia (country)
Sportsperson-politicians from Georgia (country)
Mayors of Tbilisi
Georgia (country) youth international footballers
People from Samtredia
Deputy Prime Ministers of Georgia
Georgian Dream politicians
Energy ministers of Georgia